The August Virgin is a Spanish 2019 film directed by Jonás Trueba which stars Itsaso Arana. The film was written by Trueba alongside Arana.

Plot
Eva, an out-of-work actress aged 33 who is on her own, decides not go away during the heat of August but to stay in Madrid, where a friend lets her have the use of his central apartment. She resolves to get to know the city and its inhabitants by just letting things happen. Wandering about the streets and dropping in to bars, she meets old friends and makes new friends, both men and women. 

Walking home in the early hours, she sees a man she fears is going to jump from a bridge and she hastily starts a conversation to distract him. He is Agos, who was just having a quiet cigarette before going to the bar where his girl friend works. Next evening, Eva follows Agos into the bar and continues the conversation. He is an out-of-work actor, separated from his wife and little daughter, who lives by odd jobs in bars. She goes back to his flat and they make love, after which she admits that she is pregnant. Later, when his daughter asks who the father is and Eva replies that she does not know, the little girl says that's just like the Virgin Mary.

Cast

Production
 
The August Virgin was written by director Jonás Trueba alongside leading actress Itsaso Arana. The crew was completed by the likes of Santiago Racaj (cinematography), Marta Velasco (editing), Miguel Ángel Rebollo (art direction) and Laura Renau (costume direction).

The film was produced by Los Ilusos Films and La Virgen de Agosto AIE, and it had the participation from ICAA, the regional administration and Telemadrid. It was fully shot in Madrid in the Summer of 2018, from late July to mid August, during the verbenas of San Cayetano, San Lorenzo, and La Paloma.

Release
The August Virgin made its world premiere at the 54th Karlovy Vary International Film Festival (28 June – 6 July 2019), as part of the festival's competitive lineup. Distributed by BTeam Pictures, the film was theatrically released in Spain on 15 August 2019. It premiered in France on 5 August 2020.

Awards and nominations

|-
| align = "center" rowspan = "2" | 2019 || rowspan = "2" | 24th Toulouse Spanish Film Festival || Best Actress || Itsaso Arana ||  || rowspan = "2" | 
|-
| Best Screenplay || Jonás Trueba & Itsaso Arana || 
|-
|align=center|2020||7th Feroz Awards||Best Film Poster||Laura Renau||||align=center|
|-
|align=center|2021||46th César Awards||colspan=2|Best Foreign Film||||
|}

See also
List of Spanish films of 2019

References

External links
The August Virgin at ICAA's Catálogo de Cinespañol

Spanish drama films
2019 drama films
Films set in Madrid
Films shot in Madrid
2010s Spanish-language films
2010s Spanish films